Buika is the debut studio album by Spanish singer Concha Buika. The album was released on March 15, 2005 via DRO Atlantic label.

Overview
The record fuses jazz, traditional Spanish music, electronica, funk, and several other elements.

Track listing
All songs written by Concha Buika except where otherwise specified.
 New afro Spanish generation
 Little freaky girl
 Jodida pero contenta
 Échate a mi vera
 Qué pasa
 Talk to me (Háblame), written by José Vera Lopez
 Se me escapan las palabras
 Tu caramelo
 Soleá de libertad
 Niña de fiesta + Bailando mi pena
 Nostalgias, music by Juan Carlos Cobián, lyrics by Enrique Domingo Cadícamo

References

 Information on album cover, back cover, and liner notes

External links
Official website

Spanish-language albums
2005 debut albums